Dorcadion toropovi is a species of beetle in the family Cerambycidae. It was described by Mikhail Leontievich Danilevsky in 1999. It is known from Kyrgyzstan.

References

toropovi
Beetles described in 1999